Fox 4 may refer to:

Television stations in the United States

Current
 KDFW, Dallas-Fort Worth, Texas (O&O)
KFDM-DT3, a digital channel of KFDM in Beaumont, Texas (branded as Fox 4 Beaumont)
 KFQX, Grand Junction, Colorado
 KHMT, Hardin/Billings, Montana
 KTBY, Anchorage, Alaska
 WDAF-TV, Kansas City, Missouri
 WFTX-TV, Fort Myers, Florida (cable channel, broadcasts on channel 36)

Former
 KBTV-TV, Port Arthur, Texas (2009 to 2021)
 KSNB-TV, Superior, Nebraska (1994 to 2009)

Other uses
 Fox (code word) Four, a brevity code for a simulated firing on a target by a bombardier